Bogi Ágústsson (born 6 April 1952) is a public television news reporter in Iceland.

He graduated in history from the University of Iceland in 1977. He began working as a reporter of foreign news on TV News in January 1977. He moved to Copenhagen in 1984, and brought news from the Nordic countries until 1986. In 1988, he became a press officer and director of the Radio company's communications department. In later years he has largely confined himself to the anchorship.

See also 

 List of Icelandic writers

References

Icelandic television newsreaders and news presenters
1952 births
Bogi Agustsson
Living people
Bogi Agustsson